Ralph Lee Earnhardt (February 23, 1928 – September 26, 1973) was an American stock car racer. He was the father of 7 time NASCAR Cup Series champion Dale Earnhardt, grandfather of Kerry Earnhardt, Kelley Earnhardt Miller, Dale Earnhardt Jr., and Taylor Earnhardt Putnam and great grandfather of Bobby Dale Earnhardt and Jeffrey Earnhardt. Earnhardt helped give Bobby Isaac his start in racing.

Background

Earnhardt had German ancestry. He was born in Kannapolis, North Carolina as the son of Effie Mae Earnhardt (née Furr) (August 30, 1895 – September 1979) and John Henderson Earnhardt (Mar 23, 1879 – Nov 5, 1953). John Henderson Earnhardt's first wife was Florence Phillips (Oct 7, 1877 – Nov 18, 1922). He and Florence had four daughters — Mary, Eula, Margie, and Octa Vayne.

He spent many years working in a cotton mill in North Carolina. One of the only ways out of this poor living was racing. Ralph started his racing career on dirt tracks where he was famous for keeping his car in top condition throughout each race.

Racing career
Earnhardt began racing in 1949, and in 1953 it became his full-time occupation.

In 1956, he won the NASCAR Sportsman Championship, and was runner-up in 1955 and third in 1957.

In 1967, he was the reigning South Carolina state champion, and track champion at Columbia Speedway and Greenville-Pickens Speedway.

He won the pole and finished second in his first Grand National Series race in 1956 at Hickory Speedway. In 1961, Earnhardt had his highest finish by finishing 17th in the Grand National point standings. 1961 also saw Earnhardt fill in as a relief driver for Cotton Owens in the Daytona 500, running more than 300 miles and finishing 5th.

Earnhardt was the first car builder/driver to understand and use tire stagger.

In 1972, he raced his son Dale Earnhardt at Metrolina Speedway in a race with cars from semi mod and sportsman divisions.

Earnhardt won 350 NASCAR races in different series.

Death
Earnhardt died from a heart attack on September 26, 1973 at the age of 45 while working on a carburetor at his kitchen table.

In media
In the film 3: The Dale Earnhardt Story, Ralph Earnhardt was portrayed by J. K. Simmons.

References

External links
 

1928 births
1973 deaths
American people of German descent
Burials in North Carolina
Ralph
International Motorsports Hall of Fame inductees
NASCAR drivers
People from Kannapolis, North Carolina
Racing drivers from Charlotte, North Carolina
Racing drivers from North Carolina